Cancellariidae, common name the nutmeg snails or nutmeg shells, are a family of small to medium-large sea snails, marine gastropod mollusks in the clade Neogastropoda.  Some of the shells of the species in this family resemble a nutmeg seed.

Distribution
This family occurs worldwide. Many species are found in deep water.

Taxonomy 
This family consists of three following subfamilies (according to the taxonomy of the Gastropoda by Bouchet & Rocroi, 2005):
 Cancellariinae Forbes & Hanley, 1851 - synonym: Trigonostomatinae Cossmann, 1899
 Admetinae Troschel, 1865 - synonym: Paladmetidae Stephenson, 1941
 Plesiotritoninae Beu & Maxwell, 1937

Genera
Genera in the family Cancellariidae include:

Admete Krøyer, 1842
Admetula Cossmann, 1889
Africotriton Beu & Marshall, 1987
Agatrix R. Petit, 1967
Aphera Adams & Adams, 1854
Arizelostoma Iredale, 1936
Axelella Petit, 1988
Bivetia Jousseaume, 1887
Bivetiella Wenz, 1943
Bivetopsia Jousseaume, 1887
Bonellitia Jousseaume, 1887
Brocchinia Jousseaume, 1887
Cancellaphera Iredale, 1930
Cancellaria Lamarck, 1799
Cancellicula Tabanelli, 2008
Crawfordina Dall, 1919
Euclia Adams & Adams, 1854
Fusiaphera Habe, 1961
Gerdiella Olsson and Bayer, 1972
Gergovia Cossmann, 1899
Habesolatia Kuroda, 1965
Hertleinia Marks, 1949
Inglisella Finlay, 1924
Iphinopsis Dall, 1924
Loxotaphrus Harris, 1897
Massyla Adams & Adams, 1854
Merica Adams & Adams, 1854
Mericella Thiele, 1929
Microcancilla Dall, 1924
Microsveltia Iredale, 1925
Mirandaphera Bouchet & Petit, 2002
Momoebora Kuroda & Habe, 1971
Narona Adams & Adams, 1854
Neadmete Habe, 1961
Nevia Jousseaume, 1887
Nipponaphera Habe, 1961
Nothoadmete Oliver, 1982
Paladmete Gardner, 1916
Pallidonia Laseron, 1955
Pepta Iredale, 1925
Perplicaria Dall, 1890
Pisanella Koenen, 1865
Plesiotriton Fischer, 1884
Progabbia Dall, 1918
Pseudobabylonella Brunetti, Della Bella, Forli & Vecchi, 2009
Pyruclia Olsson, 1932
Scalptia Jousseaume, 1887
Solatia Jousseaume, 1887
Solutosveltia Habe, 1961
Sveltella Cossmann, 1889
Sveltia Jousseaume, 1887
Sydaphera Iredale, 1929
Tribia Jousseaume, 1887
Trigona Perry, 1811
Trigonaphera Iredale, 1936
Trigonostoma de Blainville, 1825
Tritonium Fabricius, 1780
Tritonoharpa Dall, 1908
Unitas Palmer, 1947
Ventrilia Jousseaume, 1887
Vercomaris Garrard, 1975
Waipaoa Marwick, 1931
Zeadmete Finlay, 1926

The following genus was also accepted in 1936 by the Royal Society of New Zealand  

Anapepta Finlay, 1930

References

 Verhecken A. (2007). Revision of the Cancellariidae (Mollusca, Neogastropoda, Cancellarioidea) of the eastern Atlantic (40°N-40°S) and the Mediterranean. Zoosystema : 29(2): 281-364
 Hemmen J. (2007). Recent Cancellariidae. Wiesbaden, 428pp

External links
 Petit, Richard E., and M. G. Harasewych. "Catalogue of the Superfamily Cancellarioidea Forbes and Hanley, 1851 (Gastropoda: Prosobranchia)." (2005)
 Miocene Gastropods and Biostratigraphy of the Kern River Area, California; United States Geological Survey Professional Paper 642 

 
Gastropod families
Taxa named by Edward Forbes
Taxa named by Sylvanus Charles Thorp Hanley
Volutoidea